The Second Battle of Champagne ( or Autumn Battle) in World War I was a French offensive against the German army at Champagne that coincided with an Anglo-French assault at north-east Artois and ended with French retreat.

Battle
A second line of seven divisions followed, with one infantry division and six cavalry divisions in reserve. French artillery observers benefited from good weather but on the night of 24/25 September, heavy rain began and fell until midday.

In one part of the line, the French artillery barrage continued after the first German line had been taken, causing French casualties. The French took  and several guns but French casualties were also high; the Germans had anticipated the French attack, having been able to watch the French preparations from the high ground under their control. A supporting attack by the French Third Army on the Aisne took no ground. German reserves, directed by Falkenhayn, plugged any gaps in the German lines. 

A German counter-attack next day recaptured the ground, most of which was on a reverse slope, which had deprived the French artillery of ground observation; Joffre suspended the offensive until more ammunition could be supplied and ordered that the captured ground be consolidated and cavalry units withdrawn. Smaller French attacks against German salients continued from

Aftermath

Analysis
On 3 October, Joffre abandoned the attempt at a breakthrough in Champagne, ordering the local commanders to fight a battle of attrition, then terminated the offensive on 6 November. The French had attacked in Champagne with  against the equivalent of  divisions. On the Champagne front, the Fourth, Second and Third armies had fired  artillery and  shells, which, with the consumption during the Third Battle of Artois in the north, exhausted the French stock of ammunition.

French methods and equipment were insufficient for the demands of trench warfare and a lull followed as the French rested the survivors of the offensive, replaced losses and accumulated more equipment and ammunition. French artillery had been unable to destroy the German artillery, often situated on reverse slopes of the Champagne hills. Some French regiments attacked with bands playing and their regimental flags waving. On 22 October, Joffre claimed that the autumn offensive had resulted in important tactical gains, inflicted many casualties and achieved a moral superiority over the Germans and that only a lack of artillery had led to the failure to achieve the strategic objectives of the offensive. To keep as many German troops as possible away from the Eastern Front, offensive operations must continue but troops in the front line were to be kept to the minimum over the winter and a new strategy was to be formulated.

The theoretical bases of the French offensives of 1915 had been collected in But et conditions d'une action offensive d'ensemble (Purpose and Conditions of All Offensive Action, 16 April 1915) and its derivative, Note 5779, which were compiled from analyses of reports received from the front since 1914. The document contained instructions on infiltration tactics, rolling barrages and poison gas, which were to be used systematically in continuous battles to create . Continuous battle was to be conducted by step-by-step advances, through successive German defensive positions. Methodical attacks were to be made each time and would inexorably consume German infantry reserves. The German defences would eventually collapse and make a breakthrough attack feasible. The slower, more deliberate methods, would conserve French infantry as they battered through the deeper defences built by the Germans since 1914.

Several German divisions had returned from the Eastern Front but were tired and of little value. French reviews of the offensive found that reserves had moved close to the front, ready to exploit a breakthrough and had advanced on time. The troops had then become bunched up with the leading divisions, blocked the lines of communication and suffered many casualties while they were held up. Communications had failed and commanders had been in ignorance of the situation, artillery co-ordination with the infantry had been poor and rain grounded French artillery-observation aircraft. Many of the French commanders concluded that a breakthrough could not be forced in one attack and that it would take several set-piece battles to make the defenders collapse and be unable to prevent a return to mobile operations.

The German report, Experiences of the 3rd Army in the Autumn Battles in the Champagne, 1915, noted that unyielding defence of the most forward positions had failed several times. The French had severely damaged German field fortifications and cut the barbed wire obstacles in front of them by long artillery bombardments. The second position had not been broken into and the 3rd Army reported that the decision to construct it                                                                                                                                                                                                                                                                                                                                                                                                                                                                                                                                                                                                                                                                                                                                                                                                                                           had been vindicated, since the French had to suspend their attacks until artillery had been moved forward, which took until 4 October. The momentum of the initial breakthrough had not been maintained, because the French troops crowding forward had become disorganised, which made co-ordinated attacks impossible to arrange. French prisoners were reported to have said that there had been no methodical staging of the reserves to exploit a breakthrough and concluded with the view that one might still be possible.

It was recommended that such reserves should be made available by reducing the number of German troops in the front line, as one man every  was enough. Co-operation between all arms, assistance from neighbouring sectors and the exploitation of flanking moves had defeated the French offensive. More intermediate strong points, built for all-round defence, were recommended between the first and second positions. Defence of the first position was still the intention but deeper defences would dissipate the effect of a breakthrough and force the attackers to make numerous individual attacks, in areas where local knowledge and preparation of the ground would be advantageous to the defenders. Observation posts should be made secure from attack, reconnaissance reports acted on promptly and communication links were to be made as robust as possible. A wide field of fire was unnecessary and to be dispensed with, to make each part of the position defensible by placing it on reverse slopes, concealed from ground observation 

In his memoirs (1919), Falkenhayn wrote that the autumn battle showed that on the Western Front, quantity was not enough to defeat armies sheltering in field defences

and that the plans, made earlier in 1915 for an offensive in France, were obsolete. Falkenhayn needed to resolve the paradoxical lessons of the war since 1914, to find a way to end it favourably for Germany, which culminated at Battle of Verdun in 1916, when Falkenhayn tried to induce the French to repeat the costly failure of the Second Battle of Champagne.

Casualties
The offensive had been disappointing for the French. Despite their new 'attack in echelon' they had only made quick progress during the time it took for the Germans to strip reserves from elsewhere and rush them up. The French suffered  against  casualties, (Foley gave  based on Der Weltkrieg, the German Official History.)

See also

Notes

Footnotes

General references

Further reading
 
  Translation of Meine Tätigkeit im Weltkriege 1914–1918 (Berlin, Ernst Siegfried Mittler und Sohn 1939)

External links
 

Champagne 2
1915 in France
Champagne 2
Champagne 2
Champagne
Champagne 2
September 1915 events
October 1915 events
November 1915 events
France–Germany military relations